Les risques du métier (Risky Business) is a 1967 French drama film directed by André Cayatte. This was Jacques Brel's first feature film and co-starred Emmanuelle Riva, Jacques Harden, and Nadine Alari. Brel also produced the soundtrack with François Rauber. The film was released on 21 December 1967. Film critics praised Brel's performance.

Plot
A teenage girl accuses her primary schoolteacher, Jean Doucet (Jacques Brel), of trying to rape her. The police and the mayor investigate, but Doucet denies the charges. Two other students come forward to reveal more of Doucet's misconduct – one confessing to be his mistress. Doucet faces trial and hard labour if convicted.

Cast
 Jacques Brel as Jean Doucet
 Emmanuelle Riva as Suzanne Doucet
 René Dary as Le maire / The Mayor
 Nadine Alari as Mme Arnaud
 Christine Fabréga as M. Roussel
 Jacques Harden as R. Arnaud
 Gabriel Gobin as Le juge d'instruction
 Muriel Baptiste as Martine
 Christine Simon as Brigitte
 Chantal Martin as Josette
 Nathalie Nell as Hélène
 Delphine Desyeux as Catherine
 Claudine Berg as Mme Cault

References

External links
 

1967 films
1960s French-language films
French high school films
Jacques Brel
Films about rape
1960s high school films
Films about scandalous teacher–student relationships
Films directed by André Cayatte
Gaumont Film Company films
1960s teen drama films
French teen drama films
1960s French films